The House at 12 Vernon Street in Brookline, Massachusetts is one of the town's most elaborate Queen Anne Victorians.  The -story wood-frame house was designed by Tristram Griffin and built in 1890 for William Boynton, a Boston flour merchant.  It has classic Queen Anne elements, including a turret, multiple projecting and recessed sections. Its front porch wraps around the turret to the side, supported by paired columns above a spindled balustrade, and features a gable above the entry stairs decorated with latticework and arched spindlework framing the opening.

The house was listed on the National Register of Historic Places in 1985.

See also
National Register of Historic Places listings in Brookline, Massachusetts

References

Houses in Brookline, Massachusetts
Queen Anne architecture in Massachusetts
Houses completed in 1890
National Register of Historic Places in Brookline, Massachusetts
Houses on the National Register of Historic Places in Norfolk County, Massachusetts
1890 establishments in Massachusetts